BG Geminorum is an eclipsing binary star system in the constellation Gemini.  It consists of a K0 supergiant with a more massive but unseen companion.  The companion is likely to be either a black hole or class B star. Material from the K0 star is being transferred to an accretion disk surrounding the unidentified object.

References 

K-type supergiants
Eclipsing binaries
Gemini (constellation)
Geminorum, BG
J06033081+2741506